Miyakea is a genus of moths of the family Crambidae.

Species
Miyakea consimilis Sasaki, 2012
Miyakea expansa (Butler, 1881)
Miyakea lushanus (Inoue, 1989)
Miyakea raddeella (Caradja, 1910)
Miyakea sinevi Schouten, 1992
Miyakea ussurica Ustjuzhanin & Schouten, 1995
Miyakea zhengi W. Li & H. Li, 2007

References

Natural History Museum Lepidoptera genus database

Crambini
Crambidae genera